Fred Camillo (born June 3, 1962) is an American politician who has served as the First Selectman of Greenwich, Connecticut since 2019. He previously served in the Connecticut House of Representatives from the 151st district from 2009 to 2019. On November 5, 2019, Camillo was elected First Selectman of Greenwich, Connecticut.

Early life and education
Camillo grew in the Cos Cob section of Greenwich, Connecticut. He received his Bachelor's and Master's degrees from Manhattanville College. He is a relative of Italian-American politicians Albert P. Morano and Michael L. Morano.

Political career
Camillo was a member of the Commerce, Higher Education and Employment Advancement, and Public Safety and Security Committees of the Connecticut House. He also served as an Assistant Minority Leader of the Connecticut House.

On November 5, 2019, Camillo won the race for First Selectman of Greenwich against opponent Jill Oberlander with 57.36% of the vote against Oberlander's 42.64%.

On November 2, 2021, Camillo won re-election over Democrat William Kelly with 11,138 votes, or just over 67% of the vote.

In 2022, Camillo called for repealing a law that allowed for the construction of dense housing in localities if localities cannot demonstrate that the housing would adversely affect health, safety, and environment. He argued that municipalities should maintain local control when it comes to decisions to address the issue of housing instead of having it come through state mandates.

References

1962 births
Living people
People from Greenwich, Connecticut
Manhattanville College alumni
21st-century American politicians
American people of Italian descent
Republican Party members of the Connecticut House of Representatives